Simona Marcela Richter (born March 27, 1972 in Reșița, Caraș-Severin) is a retired female judoka from Romania. She claimed a bronze medal in the Women's Light-Heavyweight (– 78 kg) division at the 2000 Summer Olympics in Sydney, Australia, together with Italy's Emanuela Pierantozzi.

References

External links
 
 

1972 births
Living people
Romanian female judoka
Judoka at the 1992 Summer Olympics
Judoka at the 1996 Summer Olympics
Judoka at the 2000 Summer Olympics
Olympic judoka of Romania
Olympic bronze medalists for Romania
Olympic medalists in judo
Medalists at the 2000 Summer Olympics
Universiade medalists in judo
Universiade silver medalists for Romania
Medalists at the 1999 Summer Universiade
Sportspeople from Reșița
20th-century Romanian women
21st-century Romanian women